Seize the Time, released in 2006 (see 2006 in music), was the second studio album by US rock band Flattbush.

Track listing
"Serve the People" (Flattbush)
"Multiple Deportation" (Flattbush)
"Lupa" (Flattbush)
"Seize the Time" (Flattbush)
"All Power to the People" (Flattbush)
"Welga" (Flattbush)
"Community Organizer" (Flattbush)
"Prison and Beyond" (Flattbush)
"The Passion of Satan" (Flattbush)
"Hamlet" (Flattbush)
"Fascist Diktador" (Flattbush)
"AK-47 for Self Defense" (Flattbush)
"Bakit" (Flattbush)
"Red Light District II" (Flattbush)
"Awit Ng Pag-Asa/The Messiah" (Abad, Gould)

Credits
 Joe Luevano – drums
 Arman Maniago – bass guitar
 Bradley Walther – guitar
 Enriko Maniago – vocals

2006 albums